Freestyle skiing at the 2013 Winter Universiade was held in Monte Bondone from December 15 to December 18, 2013.

Men's events

Women's events

Medal table

External links
Official results at the universiadetrentino.org.

2013 in freestyle skiing
Freestyle skiing
2013
Freestyle skiing competitions in Italy